Ralph Scotoni (1901–1955) was a Swiss businessman notable for his involvement in the German film industry. He was the son of Eugen Scotoni. Between 1930 and 1935, when it was nationalised by the German government, he oversaw his family's interest in Terra Film – the second most important German production company behind UFA. Scotoni automatically became a member of the Nazi Party (as was common for owners of large companies) but never picked up his membership card. Many of his later films depicted similarities between Switzerland and Nazi Germany. He left Germany in 1935 after the nationalization of Terra.

Selected filmography
 The Man Who Murdered (1931)
 William Tell (1934)
 The Champion of Pontresina (1934)

Bibliography
 Killy, Wather. Dictionary of German Biography, Volume 9. Walter de Gruyter, 2005.

External links

1901 births
1955 deaths
Businesspeople from Zürich
Nazi Party members
Swiss film producers
20th-century Swiss businesspeople